Homalopoma concors is a species of sea snail, a marine gastropod mollusk in the family Colloniidae.

Original description
  Huang S.-I, Fu I-F. & Poppe G.T. (2016). Taiwanese and Philippine Colloniidae. Nomenclatural remarks and the description of 17 new species (Gastropoda: Colloniidae). Visaya. 4(5): 4-42. 
page(s): 11.

References

Colloniidae
Gastropods described in 2016